Indian Institute of Technology Ropar (IIT Ropar) is a public technical university located in Rupnagar, Punjab, India. It is one of the eight newer Indian Institutes of Technology (IITs) established by the Ministry of Human Resource Development (MHRD), Government of India under The Institutes of Technology (Amendment) Act, 2011 to expand the reach and enhance the quality of technical education in the country.

History
IIT Ropar was established by MHRD in 2008. The classes for academic session 2008–2009 were held at IIT Delhi. The Institute started functioning from its transit campus in Rupnagar from 1st August 2009. Foundation stone for the permanent campus of IIT Ropar was laid down on 24 February 2009 by the then Union HRD Minister Shri Arjun Singh.

Campus

Permanent Campus

IIT Ropar has shifted to its permanent campus since June 2019, except the departments of Humanities, Mathematics, Physics, Chemical Engineering and Civil Engineering, and some hostels and labs. Architecture of the entrance gate is inspired by Indus Valley civilisation with four 41 feet high stone carved pillars at the entrance. The institute started to operate from its permanent campus from July 2018. Some phases of this campus were still under construction. The campus was being built on the land earlier known as Birla Seed Farms. IIT Ropar celebrates its Foundation Day on 24 February every year. The contract was given to CPWD and a Bangkok-based construction company was assigned the task of finishing the first phase. The Computer Science Department has been shifted to this campus in July 2018. A part of the administration office was shifted on 17 June 2018. In June 2019, the Administration and Departments of Electrical, Computer Science and Mechanical Engineering completely shifted to the permanent campus.

 
The institute, in the past, operated in two different transit campuses located in Rupnagar.

Transit Campus I

The transit campus I of IIT Ropar is former Women's Polytechnic, Rupnagar. The academic and administration buildings of the Women's Polytechnic, Ropar were renovated to accommodate all the requirements of the institute.

This campus houses four hostels: three for boys (Mercury, Jupiter and Neptune Houses) and one for girls (Venus House). The day-to-day management of hostels is taken care of by a committee consisting of student representatives, faculty members (as Wardens) and administrative staff (caretakers, office-heads).

This campus currently houses the central library of the institute. It also an independent post office and a branch of State Bank of India.

Sports facilities include a cricket field, three tennis courts, a football field, a gymnasium, a basketball court, two volleyball court and also a number of facilities for several athletics. The Students Activity Center (SAC) has a gymnasium and rooms for different activity clubs.

Organisation and administration

Governance

All IITs follow the same organization structure which has President of India as visitor at the top of the hierarchy. Directly under the president is the IIT Council. Under the IIT Council is the board of governors of each IIT.
Under the board of governors is the director, who is the chief academic and executive officer of the IIT. Under the director, in the organizational structure, comes the deputy director. Under the director and the deputy director, come the deans, heads of departments, registrar.

Departments and Centres
The institute currently has 11 departments, 1 multi-disciplinary centre  and 1 DST Technology Innovation Hub. The departments are:
 Chemical Engineering
 Chemistry
 Civil Engineering
 Computer Science and Engineering
 Electrical Engineering
 Humanities and Social Sciences
 Mathematics and Computing
 Metallurgical and Materials Engineering
 Mathematics
 Mechanical Engineering
 Physics
 Biomedical Engineering

DST Technology Innovation Hub
In 2020, the Department of Science of Technology (DST) has established a Technology Innovation Hub (TIH) in the application domain of Agriculture & Water, named Agriculture and Water Technology Development Hub (AWaDH), at IIT Ropar in the framework of National Mission on Interdisciplinary Cyber-Physical Systems (NM-ICPS) with a grant of Rs. 110 crore. IIT Ropar TIH is primarily working on (i) Water and Soil Quality Assessment Processes, (ii) Water Treatment and Management, (iii) Agriculture Automation and Information Systems, (iv) Stubble Management and Urban Farming, (v) IoT Systems, and (vi) Instrumentation for mapping hazardous substances in water and soil, towards eco-friendly farming practices and to make farming more profitable for the grower. The technology innovation hub is led by Prof. Pushpendra P. Singh.

Academics

Programmes 
The institute offers undergraduate programmes awarding Bachelor of Technology in various engineering areas. Admission to these programmes is through JEE Advanced. The institute also offers postgraduate degrees awarding MTech and MSc (Research) in various engineering fields, as well as MSc in basic sciences. PhD courses in various fields are also offered.

Rankings 

IIT Ropar has ranked on 205th position in the QS Asia Ranking 2020.
The Times Higher Education World University Rankings ranked it 301–350 globally in the 2020 ranking.
The National Institutional Ranking Framework (NIRF) ranked it 25th among engineering colleges in 2020

Research 
The institute stresses in inter-disciplinary research areas including Renewable and Clean Energy, Artificial intelligence (AI), Bio-imaging and Bio-instrumentation, Agriculture & Water, Rural Technology Development, Hydrogen power, etc. A Central Research Facility has been established encompassing equipment from various departments.

From the academic year 2017–18, the institute organises Research Conclave every year.

Student life

Cultural festivals
Zeitgeist is the annual cultural festival of Indian Institute of Technology Ropar and is held annually as a three-day festival in October or November. It was conceived in September 2010. Advitiya, with its maiden edition in 2017, is the annual technical festival, which is held for three days in February or March. An annual sports festival, Aarohan is also held annually during February. It is currently in its second edition. These college fests are managed financially and conducted entirely by the students. An annual Indian classical music and dance event SPIC MACAY is also organized by the students and the faculty.

Events such as Inter Batch Cultural Championship (IBCC) and Inter Year Sports Championship are the intra-college events that are organized annually for the students of the institute.

The management of student activities is done by many boards functioning under the Student Affairs Department. These boards have elected student representatives known as General Secretaries, and an overall elected President of the Student Council. They have various societies and clubs to promote extra curricular and co-curricular activities.

Alumni Association
The IIT Ropar Alumni Association was founded on 1 February 2013.

See also
 List of universities in India
 Indian Institutes of Technology
 Education in India
 Engineering colleges in Punjab, India

References

Ropar
Educational institutions established in 2008
Rupnagar
Engineering colleges in Punjab, India
Research institutes in Punjab, India
2008 establishments in Punjab, India